The Lanyu Flying Fish Cultural Museum is a museum in Lanyu Township, Taitung County, Taiwan. The museum is located at the Lan En Cultural and Educational Foundation office.

History
With the support from the Council for Cultural Affairs, the museum was established in 2005.

Exhibitions
The museum has the following exhibits:
 Lanyu Artifact Hall
 Traditional Lanyu Houses

Activities
Besides preserving the heritage of the local culture, the museum also promotes the unique Flying Fish Festival as the theme of tourism to create more jobs. It also runs courses such as wood sculpture, fabric weaving and tour guide for the local people. The museum sponsors basketball, Taiwanese chess and traditional singing contests to promote the relationship among the residents.

Transportation
The museum is within walking distance east from Lanyu Airport.

See also
 List of museums in Taiwan

References

2005 establishments in Taiwan
Art museums and galleries in Taiwan
Decorative arts museums
Museums established in 2005
Museums in Taitung County